US Post Office-Waterloo is a historic post office building located at Waterloo in Seneca County, New York.  It was designed and built in 1924 and is one of a number of post offices in New York State designed by the Office of the Supervising Architect of the Treasury Department, James A. Wetmore. It is a symmetrically massed, one story brick building executed in the Colonial Revival style.  The roof is surmounted by a wooden cornice and brick parapet.

It was listed on the National Register of Historic Places in 1989.

References

Waterloo
Colonial Revival architecture in New York (state)
Government buildings completed in 1924
Buildings and structures in Seneca County, New York
National Register of Historic Places in Seneca County, New York
Waterloo, New York